Paul Lufkin (born 1942) is a retired American ice hockey player and coach. He was the head coach of Yale for a short time before Tim Taylor took over.

Paul Lufkin played for Boston College in the early 1960s, playing under John Kelley and making the 1963 NCAA Tournament. Lufkin's brief stint with Yale began with a rare winning season for the Bulldogs but declined sharply into a 1-win season in his third year there and he was gone soon thereafter.

Head coaching record

References

External links

1942 births
2019 deaths
American men's ice hockey forwards
Yale Bulldogs men's ice hockey coaches
Boston College Eagles men's ice hockey players
Sportspeople from Gloucester, Massachusetts
Ice hockey coaches from Massachusetts
Ice hockey players from Massachusetts